Tika Bahadur Bogati (born 26 September 1962) is a Nepalese former long-distance runner. He competed in the men's marathon at the 1988 Summer Olympics and the 1996 Summer Olympics. He was also the flag bearer for Nepal at the 1996 Olympics.

References

External links
 

1962 births
Living people
Athletes (track and field) at the 1988 Summer Olympics
Athletes (track and field) at the 1996 Summer Olympics
Nepalese male long-distance runners
Nepalese male marathon runners
Olympic athletes of Nepal
Place of birth missing (living people)
20th-century Nepalese people